Santhara Segeran Vello (born 19 May 1972) is a Malaysian cricketer. A right-handed batsman, he played for the Malaysia national cricket team between 1994 and 1998.

Biography
Born in Ipoh in 1972, Santhara Vello first played for Malaysia in the 1994 ICC Trophy in Nairobi, playing three games in the tournament. He next played in the 1997 ICC Trophy in Kuala Lumpur.

He made his List A debut in 1998, playing for Malaysia in the Wills Cup, a Pakistani domestic one-day competition. Later in the year he represented Malaysia in the cricket tournament at the 1998 Commonwealth Games, hosted in Kuala Lumpur. He played two matches in the tournament, against Sri Lanka and Zimbabwe. He has not played for Malaysia since.

References

1972 births
Living people
People from Ipoh
Malaysian people of Tamil descent
Malaysian sportspeople of Indian descent
Malaysian cricketers
Cricketers at the 1998 Commonwealth Games
Commonwealth Games competitors for Malaysia
People from Perak